Shahrukh was the 43rd and last Shirvanshah, governing Shirvan under Safavid suzerainty. After persistent disloyalty, Safavid king Tahmasp I (r. 1524—1576) expelled him in 1538, and made Shirvan a full administrative subunit of the Safavid Empire. Subsequently, he appointed his brother Alqas Mirza as its governor.

References

Sources
  

Shirvanshahs
1520 births
1539 deaths
Safavid governors of Shirvan
16th-century people of Safavid Iran